The discography of Atreyu, an American metalcore band, consists of eight studio albums, one compilation album, three extended plays, twenty-nine singles, five promotional single and twenty-seven music videos.

Albums

Studio albums

Compilation albums

Extended plays

Singles

Promotional singles

Other charted songs

Music videos

Notes

References

External links
 Official website
 Atreyu at AllMusic
 

Discographies of American artists
Heavy metal group discographies
Post-hardcore group discographies